Edible seaweed, or sea vegetables, are seaweeds that can be eaten and used for culinary purposes. They typically contain high amounts of fiber. They may belong to one of several groups of multicellular algae: the red algae, green algae, and brown algae. Seaweeds are also harvested or cultivated for the extraction of polysaccharides such as alginate, agar and carrageenan, gelatinous substances collectively known as hydrocolloids or phycocolloids. Hydrocolloids have attained commercial significance, especially in food production as food additives. The food industry exploits the gelling, water-retention, emulsifying and other physical properties of these hydrocolloids.

Most edible seaweeds are marine algae whereas most freshwater algae are toxic. Some marine algae contain acids that irritate the digestion canal, while others can have a laxative and electrolyte-balancing effect. Most marine macroalgae are nontoxic in normal quantities, but members of the genus Lyngbya are potentially lethal. Typically poisoning is caused by eating fish which have fed on Lyngbya or on other fish which have done so. This is called ciguatera poisoning. Handling Lyngbya majuscula can also cause seaweed dermatitis. Some species of Desmarestia are highly acidic, with vacuoles of sulfuric acid that can cause severe gastrointestinal problems.

The dish often served in western Chinese restaurants as 'Crispy Seaweed' is not seaweed but cabbage that has been dried and then fried.

Distribution
Seaweeds are used extensively as food in coastal cuisines around the world.  Seaweed has been a part of diets in China, Japan and Korea since prehistoric times. Seaweed is also consumed in many traditional European societies, in Iceland and western Norway, the Atlantic coast of France, northern and western Ireland, Wales and some coastal parts of South West England, as well as New Brunswick, Nova Scotia, and Newfoundland and Labrador. The Māori people of New Zealand traditionally used a few species of red and green seaweed, and Indigenous Australians ate several species.

Nutrition and uses

Seaweeds are a good source of nutrients such as proteins, vitamins, minerals, and dietary fiber. Polyphenols, polysaccharides, and sterols, as well as other bioactive molecules, are mainly responsible for the healthy properties associated with seaweed. If seaweeds are compared to terrestrial plants, they have a higher proportion of essential fatty acids as eicosapentaenoic (EPA) and docosahexaenoic (DHA) fatty acids.

Seaweed contains high levels of iodine, tyrosine relative to other foods.

Seaweed is a possible vegan source of  Vitamin B12. The vitamin is obtained from symbiotic bacteria. However, mainstream nutrition consider algal B12 sources like seaweed unreliable.

Seaweed are used in multiple cuisines:
 seaweed (Nori) wrapped sushi, maki
 seaweed in soup, stew, hot pot
 seaweed in salad
 seaweed snacks (eg. Tong Garden, Dae Chun Gim)
 seaweed in instant noodles (eg. Jongga, Four Seas, Nongshim)
 seaweed as food for livestock

Seaweeds are rich in polysaccharides that could potentially be exploited as prebiotic functional ingredients for both human and animal health applications. Prebiotics are non-digestible, selectively fermented compounds that stimulate the growth and/or activity of beneficial gut microbiota which, in turn, confer health benefits on the host. In addition, there are several secondary metabolites that are synthesized by algae such as terpenoids, oxylipins, phlorotannins, volatile hydrocarbons, and products of mixed biogenetic origin. Therefore, algae can be considered as a natural source of great interest, since they contain compounds with numerous biological activities and can be used as a functional ingredient in many technological applications to obtain functional foods. Polysaccharides in seaweed may be metabolized in humans through the action of bacterial gut enzymes. Such enzymes are frequently produced in Japanese population due to their consumption of seaweeds.

Chondrus crispus (commonly known as Irish moss) is another red alga used in producing various food additives, along with Kappaphycus and various gigartinoid seaweeds.

As a nutraceutical product, some edible seaweeds are associated with anti-inflammatory, anti-allergic, antimutagenic, antitumor, antidiabetic, antioxidant, antihyperthensive and neuroprotective properties. Edible red macroalgae such as Palmaria palmata,  (Dulse), Porphyra tenera (Nori) and Eisenia bicyclis have been measured as a relevant source of "alternative protein, minerals, and, eventually, fiber."

Feeding the seaweed Asparagopsis taxiformis to cows can reduce their methane emissions.

East Asia
In some parts of Asia, nori 海苔 (in Japan), zicai 紫菜 (in China), and gim 김 (in Korea), sheets of the dried red alga Porphyra are used in soups or to wrap sushi or onigiri.

Japanese cuisine has common names for seven types of seaweed, and thus the term for seaweed in Japanese is used primarily in scientific applications, and not in reference to food.

Agar-agar (kanten 寒天), probably first discovered in Japan, is also widely used as a substitute for gelatin.

Southeast Asia
Sea grapes (Caulerpa lentillifera and Caulerpa racemosa) and Gusô (Eucheuma spp.) are traditionally eaten in the cuisines of Southeast Asia (as well as in Oceania and warmer areas of East Asia). These edible warm-water seaweed were first commercially cultivated in the Philippines. In the northern Philippines, the cold-water red seaweed Pyropia vietnamensis is also traditionally harvested from the wild and dried into black nori-like sheets called gamet which are used as ingredients in cooking.

In the Philippines, a traditional ingredient is gulaman, which is made from carrageenan extracted from edible seaweed in the pioneering tropical seaweed farming industry in the country. It is also used as a substitute for gelatin. It is widely used in various traditional desserts. Carrageenan as a gelatin substitute has also spread to other parts of Southeast Asia, like in Indonesia, where it is used for desserts like es campur.

Seaweed is also processed into noodles by residents of Tiwi, Albay, which can be cooked into pancit canton, pancit luglug, spaghetti or carbonara. such as being rich in calcium, magnesium and iodine.

Common edible seaweeds
Common edible seaweeds include:

Red algae (Rhodophyta) 
 Carola (Callophyllis spp.)
 Carrageen moss (Mastocarpus stellatus)
 Dulse (Palmaria palmata)
 Eucheuma
 Eucheuma spinosum
 Eucheuma cottonii
 Gamet (Pyropia vietnamensis)
 Gelidiella (Gelidiella acerosa)
 Gim (Pyropia, Porphyra)
 Gusô (Eucheuma cottonii/Eucheuma denticulatum)
Halosaccion glandiforme
 Ogonori (Gracilaria)
 Gracilaria edulis
 Gracilaria corticata
 Grapestone Mastocarpus papillatus
 Hypnea
 Irish moss (Chondrus crispus)
 Laverbread (Porphyra laciniata/Porphyra umbilicalis)
 Nori (Porphyra)

Green algae
 Chlorella (Chlorella sp.)
 Gutweed (Ulva intestinalis)
 Sea grapes or green caviar (Caulerpa lentillifera)
Caulerpa racemosa
 Sea lettuce (Ulva spp.)

Brown algae (Phaeophyceae)

Kelp (Laminariales)
 Arame (Eisenia bicyclis)
 Badderlocks (Alaria esculenta)
 Cochayuyo (Durvillaea antarctica)
 Ecklonia cava
 Kombu (Saccharina japonica)
 Oarweed (Laminaria digitata)
 Sea palm Postelsia palmaeformis
 Bull kelp (Nereocystis luetkeana)
 Sugar kelp (Saccharina latissima)
 Wakame (Undaria pinnatifida)
 Hiromi (Undaria undarioides)

Fucales
 Bladderwrack (Fucus vesiculosus)
 Channelled wrack (Pelvetia canaliculata)
 Hijiki or Hiziki (Sargassum fusiforme)
 Limu Kala (Sargassum echinocarpum)
 Sargassum
 Sargassum cinetum
 Sargassum vulgare
 Sargassum swartzii
 Sargassum myriocysum
 Spiral wrack (Fucus spiralis) 
 Thongweed (Himanthalia elongata)

Ectocarpales
 Mozuku (Cladosiphon okamuranus)

See also
 
 
 Seaweed oil

References

External links

 Seaweeds used as human food an FAO report

 
Japanese cuisine
Philippine cuisine